Phaeoclavulina abietina, commonly known as the green-staining coral, is a coral mushroom in the family Gomphaceae. It is characterized by the green staining reaction it develops in response to bruising or injury.

Taxonomy
The species was first described by Christian Hendrik Persoon in 1794 as Clavaria abietina.  It is commonly known as the "green-staining coral". It was classified in the genus Ramaria (in the subgenus Echinoramaria), until molecular phylogenetic showed that Ramaria was polyphyletic.

Description
Fruit bodies are leathery, and brittle when dry. The slender branches are slightly flattened or spreading, and forked or crested near the top. The color of the fruit body is medium yellow green to light olive, but will bruise a darker olive green to dark olive green. The stem is short, and have a mat of mycelia at its base, which is attached to rhizomorphs that branch into the substrate. The odor of the mushroom tissue ranges from indistinct to earthy, and it tastes initially sweet, then somewhat bitter. The species is inedible.

The spores are dark orange-yellow when collected in mass. Spores are pip-shaped to broadly elliptical, with one oblique end; their dimensions are 6–9 by 3.5–4.5 μm. The basidia (spore-bearing cells) are typically four-spored, with the spores attached by sterigmata up to 7 μm long.

Similar species
Similar in appearance is Ramara invalii, but this species does not stain when bruised.

Habitat and distribution
Fruit bodies grow scattered or in groups (sometimes arranged in rows) on the ground in duff of coniferous forests. In North America, it is found in the Pacific Northwest and Mexico. It is also found in Europe.

References

External links

Gomphaceae
Fungi described in 1794
Fungi of Europe
Fungi of North America
Inedible fungi
Taxa named by Christiaan Hendrik Persoon